The 1946 Cal Poly Mustangs football team represented California Polytechnic School—now known as California Polytechnic State University, San Luis Obispo—as a member of the California Collegiate Athletic Association (CCAA) during the 1946 college football season. Led by Howie O'Daniels, who returned for his tenth season as head coach after having helmed the team from 1933 to 1941, Cal Poly compiled an overall record of 6–2–1 with a mark of 1–1 in conference play, placing in a three-way tie for second in the CCAA. The team outscored their opponents 152 to 88 for the season. The Mustangs played home games at Mustang Stadium in San Luis Obispo, California. 

This was the first year Cal Poly had competed in the CCAA.

Schedule

Notes

References

Cal Poly
Cal Poly Mustangs football seasons
Cal Poly Mustangs football